Anna Scharf is an American lobbyist, farmer, political advisor, and politician who was appointed to the Oregon House of Representatives for the 23rd district on July 6, 2021.

Education 
Scharf graduated from Philomath High School in 1987. She earned a Bachelor of Science degree in political science from Southern Oregon University and a Master of Business Administration from the University of Phoenix.

Career 
From 1995 to 2006, Scharf worked for Hewlett-Packard. She was then a strategic sourcing manager for FMC Corporation and a supply chain manager for GK Machine. In 2010 and 2011, she was a membership manager for the Strategic Economic Development Corporation of Oregon. She has worked as an office manager of her family's farm since 2012. Since 2020, Scharf has worked as a seasonal legislative policy analyst for the 23rd district of the Oregon House of Representatives. After Mike Nearman was expelled from the House, Scharf was selected by county commissioners from the 23rd district's four counties to succeed him.

References 

Living people
Year of birth missing (living people)
Republican Party members of the Oregon House of Representatives
Southern Oregon University alumni
University of Phoenix alumni
Women state legislators in Oregon